Caudatoscelis caudata is a species of mantis in the family Amorphoscelidae.

See also
List of mantis genera and species

References

Caudatoscelis
Insects described in 1914